K. Joseph Shekarchi (born May 17, 1962) is an American politician currently serving as the Speaker of the Rhode Island House of Representatives. A Democrat, he has represented District 23 in Warwick since January 1, 2013. He was chairman of the House Labor Committee until his Democratic colleagues elected him as the House majority leader in November 2016. After four years as majority leader, his colleagues elected him speaker in November 2020 following the defeat of longtime speaker Nicholas Mattiello. Shekarchi considers himself a moderate Democrat.

Education
Shekarchi earned his bachelor's degree in government from Suffolk University and his Juris Doctor from the Suffolk University Law School. He attended Mount St. Charles Academy in Woonsocket, Rhode Island prior to attending Suffolk.

Elections
2012 When incumbent District 23 Democratic Representative Robert Flaherty failed to qualify for the ballot, Shekarchi was unopposed for the September 11, 2012, Democratic Primary, winning with 536 votes and won the November 6, 2012, General election with 4,302 votes (67.9%) against Republican nominee John Falkowski.

Personal
Shekarchi is openly gay. He is the second openly gay speaker of the Rhode Island House, after Gordon Fox.

References

External links
Official page at the Rhode Island General Assembly
Campaign site

K. Joseph Shekarchi at Ballotpedia

|-

1962 births
Living people
21st-century American politicians
Gay politicians
LGBT state legislators in Rhode Island
Place of birth missing (living people)
Politicians from Warwick, Rhode Island
Rhode Island lawyers
Speakers of the Rhode Island House of Representatives
Democratic Party members of the Rhode Island House of Representatives
Suffolk University Law School alumni